The Asian dowitcher (Limnodromus semipalmatus) is a rare medium-large wader.

Description
Adults have dark legs and a long straight dark bill, somewhat shorter than that of the long-billed dowitcher. The body is brown on top and reddish underneath in breeding plumage. The tail has a black and white barred pattern. The winter plumage is largely grey.

Their breeding habitat is grassy wetlands in inland Siberia and Manchuria. They migrate to southeast  Asia as far south as northern Australia, although both the breeding and wintering areas are poorly known. This bird is always found on coasts during migration and wintering.

These birds forage by probing in shallow water or on wet mud. They mainly eat insects, mollusks, crustaceans and marine worms, but also eat some plant material.

Closer species
The confusion species for this bird is not, as might be expected, one of the American dowitchers, which in any case do not overlap in range, because the Asian bird is much larger. It closely resembles a small bar-tailed godwit, although the dowitcher "sewing machine" feeding action and the yelping call are distinctions from the more widespread bird.

Further reading 

Shorebirds by Hayman, Marchant and Prater,

References 

Asian dowitcher
Asian dowitcher
Birds of Asia
Birds of Manchuria
Birds of Mongolia
Asian dowitcher
Asian dowitcher
Articles containing video clips